KNF may refer to 

Kernel Normal Form, computer programming style
Kuroda normal form, a normal form for context-sensitive grammars
Korea Nuclear Fuel, a South Korean company
Korean natural farming, developed by Cho Han Kyu
IATA airport code for RAF Marham
 Financial Supervision Authority in Poland, 
 The Koshland-Némethy-Filmer model, a theory of the cooperativity of protein subunits